Deer Hunting with Jesus: Dispatches from America's Class War is a book written by Joe Bageant published in 2007. It concerns his return to his hometown of Winchester, Virginia, and his take on income inequality and problems facing the working poor.

References

2007 non-fiction books
Poverty in the United States
Working class in the United States
Books about Virginia
Winchester, Virginia